Yorktown is a town in Mount Pleasant Township, Delaware County, Indiana, United States. The population was 11,548 at the 2020 census. It is part of the Muncie, IN Metropolitan Statistical Area.

Geography

Demographics

2020 census
As of the census of 2020,  there were 11,548 people, 4,568 households, and 2,832 families living in the town. The racial makeup of the town was 90.2% White, 1.9% African American, 2.4% Asian, 0.1% Native American or Alaskan Native, 0.1% Native Hawaiian or Pacific Islander, 0.6% from other races, and 4.6% from two or more races. Hispanic or Latino of any race were 2.0% of the population.

There were 4,568 households, of which 25.1% had children under the age of 18 living with them, 59.1% were married couples living together, 21.0% had a female householder with no husband present, 15.5% had a male householder with no wife present, and 4.4% were non-families. 36.5% of all households were made up of individuals. The average household size was 2.53 and the average family size was 2.91.

18.6% of the population had never been married. 60.6% of residents were married and not separated, 4.7% were widowed, 15.7% were divorced, and 0.5% were separated.

The median age in the town was 40.3. 6.5% of residents were under the age of 5; 25.1% of residents were under the age of 18; 74.9% were age 18 or older; and 18.4% were age 65 or older. 7.2% of the population were veterans.

The most common language spoken at home was English with 97.0% speaking it at home, 1.5% spoke another Indo-European language at home and 1.5% spoke an Asian or Pacific Islander language at home. 2.7% of the population were foreign born.

The median household income in Gaston was $66,785, 18.9% greater than the median average for the state of Indiana. 8.7% of the population were in poverty, including 14.2% of residents under the age of 18. The poverty rate for the town was 4.2% lower than that of the state. 11.7% of the population was disabled and 4.2% had no healthcare coverage. 21.3% of the population had attained a high school or equivalent degree, 27.1% had attended college but received no degree, 12.9% had attained an Associate's degree or higher, 18.6% had attained a Bachelor's degree or higher, and 14.0% had a graduate or professional degree. 6.1% had no degree. 63.0% of Yorktown residents were employed, working a mean of 36.8 hours per week.

2010 census
As of the census of 2010, there were 9,405 people, 3,648 households, and 2,726 families living in the town. The racial makeup of the town was 95.3% White, 1.6% African American, 0.2% Native American, 1.5% Asian, 0.4% from other races, and 1.0% from two or more races. Hispanic or Latino of any race were 1.3% of the population.

There were 3,648 households, of which 34.6% had children under the age of 18 living with them, 59.9% were married couples living together, 10.9% had a female householder with no husband present, 3.9% had a male householder with no wife present, and 25.3% were non-families. 21.2% of all households were made up of individuals, and 9.9% had someone living alone who was 65 years of age or older. The average household size was 2.55 and the average family size was 2.95.

The median age in the town was 41.2 years. 25.7% of residents were under the age of 18; 6.6% were between the ages of 18 and 24; 22.9% were from 25 to 44; 27.7% were from 45 to 64; and 17% were 65 years of age or older. The gender makeup of the town was 47.5% male and 52.5% female.

2000 census
As of the census of 2000, there were 4,785 people, 1,842 households, and 1,368 families living in the town. The racial makeup of the town was 97.64% White, 0.96% African American, 0.15% Native American, 0.36% Asian, 0.23% from other races, and 0.67% from two or more races. Hispanic or Latino of any race were 0.73% of the population.

There were 1,842 households, out of which 37.5% had children under the age of 18 living with them, 61.5% were married couples living together, 10.2% had a female householder with no husband present, and 25.7% were non-families. 21.8% of all households were made up of individuals, and 8.6% had someone living alone who was 65 years of age or older. The average household size was 2.53 and the average family size was 2.96.

In the town, the population was spread out, with 26.7% under the age of 18, 7.2% from 18 to 24, 29.0% from 25 to 44, 23.6% from 45 to 64, and 13.5% who were 65 years of age or older. The median age was 37 years. For every 100 females, there were 91.4 males. For every 100 females age 18 and over, there were 87.4 males.

The median income for a household in the town was $50,974, and the median income for a family was $58,784. Males had a median income of $41,346 versus $26,611 for females. The per capita income for the town was $26,065. About 3.9% of families and 4.1% of the population were below the poverty line, including 6.0% of those under age 18 and 4.3% of those age 65 or over.

History 
Yorktown lies at the junction of the White River and Buck Creek. According to local legend, the Miami Indians believed that the peculiar configuration of the junction made Yorktown immune from tornadoes.

Yorktown was platted in 1837 by Oliver H. Smith who represented Indiana in the U.S. Senate from 1837 to 1843 and was a member of the Committee on Public Lands. Smith eventually became involved in the railroad business, and Yorktown was joined to Indianapolis by railroad in the early 1850s. Yorktown's main street bears Smith's name.

Yorktown benefited from the 1880s natural gas boom in the area, and was the site of several glass factories in the late nineteenth and early twentieth centuries. (The gas gave names to nearby the towns of Gaston and Gas City and drew the Ball Brothers to Muncie.)

In 1892, a developer platted "West Muncie" on land immediately adjacent to Yorktown (but roughly ten miles from Muncie). Buck Creek was dammed to form "Lake Delaware" which became the focus of a 73-room resort hotel opened in 1893. However, the dam ruptured within a few years and the entire West Muncie project was abandoned. Its most enduring legacy was perhaps that Yorktown was erroneously labeled "West Muncie" on some road maps into the 1960s and perhaps later, puzzling most local residents, who had neither seen nor heard the name in any other context.

The town has been served by the Big Four Railroad and its successors: the New York Central, Penn Central, Conrail and CSX. The town was also served by an electric interurban line, the Union Traction Company of Indiana and its successor Indiana Railroad, in the early twentieth century.

In the mid twentieth century, many residents found employment in automotive plants in nearby Muncie and Anderson, most associated with General Motors. General Motors in Muncie, closed down in 2003. Borg Warner in Yorktown closed in 2009. Yorktown also served as corporate headquarters of the Marsh Supermarkets chain from 1952 until 1991, a fact reflected in the chain's "Yorktown" store brand. Marsh Supermarkets and Village Pantry headquarters relocated in Indianapolis until Marsh went bankrupt and shut down in 2017.

Former Yorktown Clerk-Treasurer Beth Neff was the defendant in high-profile court proceedings (State of Indiana v. Beth A. Neff, 18S-IF-478) that saw the Indiana Supreme Court clarify state statutes relating to the conditions under which Indiana judiciaries may remove publicly elected municipal officials from office.

Education
The town has a free lending library, the Yorktown Public Library.

Notes

Notable Yorktownians
James Armstrong, former President of the National Council of Churches, spent his infancy in Yorktown.
Jacob Bartlett, writer/artist on the webcomic Terminal Crossing, grew up in Yorktown.
Ted Haggard, prominent Evangelical Christian, grew up in Yorktown.
Jack Parkinson, All-American (2nd Team) Basketball player at the University of Kentucky.
Bruce Parkinson, Gold Medal (Pan-Am Games)-winning basketball player; All-Big Ten point guard, son of Jack.
Jonathon Newby, founding member of music group Brazil grew up in Yorktown.
Carl Storie, Lead singer of the band Faith Band
Seth Cook singer and songwriter grew up in Yorktown
Clifford Barker, 1948 Olympic Basketball player and Gold Medal Winner

Education

Elementary schools
 Pleasant View Elementary (Grade K-2)
 Yorktown Elementary School (Grades 3–5)

Middle schools
 Yorktown Middle School (Grades 6–8)

High schools
 Yorktown High School

Alternative Schools
 Youth Opportunity Center

External links

Town of Yorktown, Indiana website
Revolution Football Semi-Pro Team of Yorktown, Indiana website
Chamber of Commerce
Yorktown News at Muncie Free Press

Towns in Delaware County, Indiana
Towns in Indiana
1837 establishments in Indiana
Populated places established in 1837